KYRK (106.5 FM) is a radio station licensed to Taft, Texas, United States, the station serves the Corpus Christi area. The station is currently owned by Withers Family Texas Holdings, LP. Bandtango is a brand and sound image concept of Mike Quinn and Bandtango Inc., a Los Angeles entertainment technology company. 

The station signed on at 106.5 FM with 50,000 watts on July 15, 2011. It was renamed Bandtango Radio on August 10, 2021 in partnership with Withers Family Texas Holdings, LP.

History
The station was assigned the call letters KZTX on September 5, 1984. On March 20, 1998, the station changed its call sign to KTKY. On April 26, 2011, the station changed its call sign to the current KYRK.

On October 9, 2014, KYRK flipped from classic hits to an alternative rock format, branded as "106.5 The Shark".

On May 3, 2015, the "Shark" alternative rock format moved to 94.7, and KYRK fell silent.

On May 20, 2015, KYRK adopted 94.7's old country format as "Rig Radio 106.5".

On July 22, 2015, KYRK returned to its "Shark" alternative rock format.

On August 10, 2021, KYRK relaunched under the new brand "105.5 BANDTANGO Radio New Alternative First" an alternative music format.
<ref>https://radioinsight.com/headlines/211807/106-5-the-shark-corpus-christi-does-the-bandtango/<ref>

References

External links

YRK
Alternative rock radio stations in the United States